Wen Shengchang (1 November 1921 – 20 March 2022) was a Chinese oceanographer and academic who was a professor at the Ocean University of China, a former president of Shandong Institute of Oceanology, and an academician of the Chinese Academy of Sciences. He was a member of the Jiusan Society and the Chinese Communist Party.

Biography 
He elementary studied in Huangchuan Middle School and secondary studied in Yichang High School and Hubei United High School. In 1940, he entered Leshan Central Technical College and soon was admitted to the Department of Machinery, Wuhan University in Leshan, Sichuan.

After graduation in 1944, he had successively served as a probationer in the 8th Aircraft Repair Shop of Chengdu Aviation Commission, a member of the examination unit of the 11th Aircraft Repair Shop, and an operator of the Air Transport 103 Squadron of the Republic of China Air Force. In 1946, he was sent to study at the American Aviation Machinery School at the expense of the government for a year.

In 1952, he became a professor at Harbin Institute of Military Engineering (now National University of Defense Technology). One year later, Professor  invited him to join the Department of Oceanography, Shandong University in Qingdao. He joined the Jiusan Society in March 1956 and the Chinese Communist Party in February 1983. He was promoted to be president of Shandong Institute of Oceanology (later reshuffled as the Ocean University of China) in 1984, concurrently serving as director of the Institute of Physical Oceanography.

On 20 March 2022, he died in Qingdao, Shandong, at the age of 100.

Honours and awards 
 1985 State Science and Technology Progress Award (Second Class)
 1993 Member of the Chinese Academy of Sciences (CAS)
 1997 State Science and Technology Progress Award (Third Class)
 1999 Science and Technology Progress Award of the Ho Leung Ho Lee Foundation

References 

1921 births
2022 deaths
People from Guangshan County
Scientists from Henan
National Wuhan University alumni
Members of the Jiusan Society
Academic staff of Ocean University of China
Members of the Chinese Academy of Sciences
Physical oceanographers
Chinese centenarians
Men centenarians
Presidents of universities and colleges in China
Chinese oceanographers
Academic staff of Shandong University